Daniel J. Gross Catholic High School is a secondary school owned by the Archdiocese of Omaha and sponsored by the Marianists. It is located in north Bellevue, Nebraska, United States, 6 blocks south of Harrison Street. The entrance to the school is at 44th and Margo Street. The school's athletic teams are the Cougars; its colors are burnt orange and royal blue.

School history 
The Archdiocese of Omaha built a new high school to provide Catholic education in Sarpy County and south Omaha.  Louise Gross donated much money to the construction  
of the high school and wished to honor her late husband, Daniel Gross; accordingly, the newly constructed high school was named Daniel J. Gross Catholic High School.

Archbishop Gerald Bergan invited the priests and brothers from the Society of Mary and the Franciscan Sisters of Our Lady of Perpetual Help to help create the Gross Catholic community. Bro. Leo Willett, S.M., the first principal, opened the school on September 3, 1968, with a freshman class of 175 students. The Class of 1972 became the first graduating class on May 28, 1972. Today, Gross Catholic has over 8200 alumni.

Crest

The crest is divided by a cross. The upper left quarter bears an "A" superimposed on an "M". This symbol of the Blessed Virgin Mary represents the Marian consecration of the two religious orders that founded the school, the Marianists and the Franciscan Sisters of Our Lady of Perpetual Help. The Franciscan cord appears in this quarter. In the upper right quarter are the scales, the symbol of the law profession which was the career of Daniel J. Gross (1897–1958), a prominent Omaha attorney in whose memory the school was named. The lower right quarter is a torch representative of the school's seeking achievement and excellence in academics and activities. It is surmounted by a banner inscribed with the school's founding date, 1968. The lower right quarter bears a part of the coat of arms of Archbishop Gerald T. Bergan, under whose inspiration and leadership the school was conceived.

On the ribbon at the bottom is inscribed the motto "Dux esto", which translates as "Be a leader." At the top are three chain links representing the archdiocesan officials, parish priests and elementary school teachers; the benefactors, parents, and friends of the school; the faculty and staff. All these are fastened by a circle representing the students, who are the real concern and connecting link of the above individuals and groups.

Athletics
Gross students participate in the following interscholastic sports: in the fall season, boys' tennis, cross country, football, girls' golf, softball, and volleyball; in the winter season, boys' basketball, girls' basketball, swimming, water polo and wrestling; and in the spring season,  baseball, boys' golf, boys' soccer, girls' soccer, girls' tennis, track, and trap shooting.

Cougar athletic teams have won a total of 19 state championships:

As of 2012, Omaha Northwest was the only other school in Nebraska that had won four consecutive baseball championships.  A total of 31 Cougar wrestlers have won individual state championships. Two individuals have won state cross country championships, one girl and one boy. One individual boy has claimed an individual state championship in the 3200 meter run in track. There has also been a men's state champion 4x800 meter team.

Notable alumni
Brian Blankenship, NFL offensive lineman for the Pittsburgh Steelers
Chad Meyers, MLB player for the Chicago Cubs
Erik Haula, NHL player for the Minnesota Wild and the Vegas Golden Knights.
Jack Randl, USHL Former captain for the Omaha Lancers and forward for the Omaha Mavericks men's ice hockey.
Joe Berg, USHL Captain for the Tri-City Storm, Princeton Tigers men's ice hockey player.
Mike McDonnell, member of the Nebraska Legislature representing the 5th district.

References

External links
 Daniel J. Gross Catholic High School website

Catholic secondary schools in Nebraska
Roman Catholic Archdiocese of Omaha
Educational institutions established in 1968
Buildings and structures in Bellevue, Nebraska
Schools in Sarpy County, Nebraska